Jairzinho Rozenstruik (born 17 March 1988) is a Surinamese mixed martial artist and former kickboxer, who currently competes in the Heavyweight division of the Ultimate Fighting Championship (UFC). He currently holds the record for second fastest knockout in the heavyweight division against Allen Crowder at UFC Fight Night 154. In kickboxing, he is a former WLF Super Heavyweight Tournament Champion and a Superkombat World Grand Prix I 2013 Runner-Up. As of August 1, 2022, he is #9 in the UFC heavyweight rankings.

Background
Rozenstruik was born and raised in Paramaribo. His parents were football fans and named him after the Brazilian star Jairzinho. In February 2020, the original Jairzinho reacted to highlights of his namesake's knockouts. Rozenstruik played football and basketball before starting to train kickboxing at the age of seventeen in a local gym. After he competed in kickboxing, he transitioned to  mixed martial arts in 2012.

Martial arts career

Kickboxing 
At the age of seventeen, Rozenstruik started training in a gym called Rens Project. There he started to take kickboxing lessons and soon he was discovered by Michael Babb, a coach from the Vos Gym in Amsterdam, Netherlands. Trained by Babb, he came out for the House of Legends under the supervision of Ivan Hippolyte.

Rozenstruik started his combat sports career in kickboxing. He won a total of 76 matches with 64 of them by knockout out of 85 he competed in.

Mixed martial arts career

Early career 

In May 2012, Rozenstruik won his debut MMA fight against Evgeny Boldyrev at DRAKA MMA: Governor's Cup 7 in Vladivostok, Russia.

In April 2017, after five years of focusing on his kickboxing career, Rozenstruik won an MMA match versus Engelbert Berbin during a regional promotion in Aruba.

In April 2018, Rozenstruik signed a multi-fight contract with the Rizin Fighting Federation.

In May 2018, Rozenstruik won his promotional debut versus Andrey Kovalev at Rizin FF – Rizin 10 by split decision.

Ultimate Fighting Championship 

Rozenstruik made his UFC debut on February 2, 2019 against Júnior Albini, replacing injured Dmitry Sosnovskiy, at UFC Fight Night: Assunção vs. Moraes 2. He won  the fight via TKO in the second round.

Rozenstruik faced Allen Crowder on June 22, 2019 at UFC Fight Night: Moicano vs. The Korean Zombie. He won the fight via knockout in round one. This fight earned him the Performance of the Night award.

Rozenstruik faced Andrei Arlovski on November 2, 2019 at UFC 244. He won the fight via knockout in round one.

Rozenstruik faced Alistair Overeem, replacing Walt Harris due to the ongoing search for his missing step-daughter, on December 7, 2019 at UFC on ESPN 7. He won the fight via knockout in round five.

Rozenstruik was scheduled to face Francis Ngannou on March 28, 2020 at UFC on ESPN: Ngannou vs. Rozenstruik. However, due to the COVID-19 pandemic, it was announced the event has been postponed. The pair were rescheduled to meet on April 18, 2020 at UFC 249. However, on April 9, Dana White, the president of UFC announced that the event was once again postponed and the bout eventually took place on May 9, 2020. Rozenstruik lost the fight via knockout just 20 seconds into the first round.

Rozenstruik faced Junior dos Santos on August 15, 2020 at UFC 252. He won the fight via technical knockout in the second round.

Rozenstruik faced Ciryl Gane on February 27, 2021 at UFC Fight Night: Rozenstruik vs. Gane. He lost the fight via unanimous decision.

Rozenstruik faced Augusto Sakai on June 5, 2021 at UFC Fight Night: Rozenstruik vs. Sakai. He won the fight via knockout in the closing seconds of the first round. This win earned him the Performance of the Night award.

Rozenstruik faced Curtis Blaydes on September 25, 2021 at UFC 266. He lost the fight via unanimous decision.

Rozenstruik was scheduled to face Marcin Tybura on February 26, 2022 at UFC Fight Night 202. However, in mid January it was announced the bout was moved to UFC 273 on April 9, 2022. However, the bout was pulled from the card after Tybura withdrew due to an undisclosed illness.

Rozenstruik faced Alexander Volkov on June 4, 2022 at UFC Fight Night 207. He lost the fight via technical knockout in round one.

Rozenstruik was scheduled to face Chris Daukaus on October 1, 2022 at UFC Fight Night 211. However, for unknown reasons, the bout was moved to UFC 282 on December 10, 2022. Rozenstruik won the fight via technical knockout just twenty three seconds into the first round. This win earned him the Performance of the Night award.

Rozenstruik is scheduled to faced Jailton Almeida on May 13, 2023 at UFC Fight Night 224.

Championships and accomplishments

Mixed martial arts
Ultimate Fighting Championship
Performance of the Night (Three times)  
MMAJunkie.com
2019 Newcomer of the Year
2019 Comeback of the Year 
CombatPress.com
2019 Comeback of the Year

Kickboxing 
Zweet en Tranen world championship
2018 Zweet en Tranen Heavyweight Champion (SuThaiBo)  champion (1 time)
DangerZone
2017 DangerZone Heavyweight Champion (1 time)
Wu Lin Feng
2016 WLF Super Heavyweight Tournament Champion (1 time)
SUPERKOMBAT Fighting Championship
2013 SUPERKOMBAT World Grand Prix I Tournament Runner-up 
SLAMM!!
Soema Na Basi Heavyweight Champion (3 times) 2012, 2013 and 2016
Lifetime Achievement Award
"Lifetime Achievement Award" by the Minister of Youth and Sports of Suriname for his national and international performances

Personal life 
Rozenstruik has two daughters.

Legal issues 
In August 2014, Rozenstruik was arrested and detained by the Dutch police on suspicion of smuggling drugs along with seven other Surinamese in the Netherlands. The group claimed they were attending a kickboxing event. After 14 days of detention, Rozenstruik was released as the authorities found 7 members of the group had swallowed balls of drugs but not Rozenstruik, and he was the only kickboxer in the group.

Mixed martial arts record

|- 
|Win
|align=center|13–4
|Chris Daukaus
|TKO (punches)
|UFC 282
|
|align=center|1
|align=center|0:23
|Las Vegas, Nevada, United States
|
|-
|Loss
|align=center|12–4
|Alexander Volkov
|TKO (punches)
|UFC Fight Night: Volkov vs. Rozenstruik
|
|align=center|1
|align=center|2:12
|Las Vegas, Nevada, United States
|
|-
|Loss
|align=center|12–3
|Curtis Blaydes
|Decision (unanimous)
|UFC 266
|
|align=center|3
|align=center|5:00
|Las Vegas, Nevada, United States
|
|-
|Win
|align=center|12–2
|Augusto Sakai
|TKO (punches)
|UFC Fight Night: Rozenstruik vs. Sakai
|
|align=center|1
|align=center|4:59
|Las Vegas, Nevada, United States
|
|-
|Loss
|align=center|11–2
|Ciryl Gane
|Decision (unanimous)
|UFC Fight Night: Rozenstruik vs. Gane
|
|align=center|5
|align=center|5:00
|Las Vegas, Nevada, United States
|
|-
|Win
|align=center|11–1
|Junior dos Santos
|TKO (punches)
|UFC 252
|
|align=center|2
|align=center|3:47
|Las Vegas, Nevada, United States
|
|-
|Loss
|align=center|10–1
|Francis Ngannou
|KO (punches)
|UFC 249
|
|align=center|1
|align=center|0:20
|Jacksonville, Florida, United States
|
|-
|Win
|align=center|10–0
|Alistair Overeem
|KO (punch)
|UFC on ESPN: Overeem vs. Rozenstruik
|
|align=center|5
|align=center|4:56
|Washington, D.C., United States
| 
|-
|Win
|align=center|9–0
|Andrei Arlovski
|KO (punch)
|UFC 244
|
|align=center|1
|align=center|0:29
|New York City, New York, United States
|
|-
|Win
|align=center|8–0
|Allen Crowder
|KO (punches)
|UFC Fight Night: Moicano vs. The Korean Zombie
|
|align=center|1
|align=center|0:09
|Greenville, South Carolina, United States
|
|-
|Win
|align=center|7–0
|Júnior Albini
|TKO (head kick and punches)
|UFC Fight Night: Assunção vs. Moraes 2
|
|align=center|2
|align=center|0:54
|Fortaleza, Brazil
|
|-
|Win
|align=center|6–0
|Robert McCarthy
|KO (punches)
|Team Yvel: Fearless 3
|
|align=center|1
|align=center|0:10
|Paramaribo, Suriname
|
|-
|Win
|align=center|5–0
|Andrey Kovalev
|Decision (split)
|Rizin 10
|
|align=center|3
|align=center|5:00
|Fukuoka, Japan
|
|-
|Win
|align=center|4–0
|Marvin Aboeli
|TKO (punches)
|Fighting with the Stars: Bloed, Zweet & Tranen 3
|
|align=center|1
|align=center|N/A
|Paramaribo, Suriname
|
|-
|Win
|align=center|3–0
|Engelbert Berbin
|KO (punches)
|AIF 1
|
|align=center|1
|align=center|N/A
|Oranjestad, Aruba
|
|-
|Win
|align=center|2–0
|Evgeni Boldyrev
|KO (punch)
|Draka 11
|
|align=center|1
|align=center|2:05
|Khabarovsk Krai, Russia
|
|-
|Win
|align=center|1–0
|Evgeni Boldyrev
|KO (punch)
|Draka 7
|
|align=center|1
|align=center|2:36
|Vladivostok, Russia
|
|-

Kickboxing record (incomplete)

|-
|-  bgcolor="#CCFFCC"
| 30 July 2017 || Win ||align=left| Carlos Salazar || Deadly Despair 2 || Paramaribo, Suriname || TKO || 3 || N/A 
|-
|-  bgcolor="#CCFFCC"
| 27 December 2016 || Win ||align=left| Sergio Pique || Bloed, Zweet & Tranen 2 || Paramaribo, Suriname || KO || 2 || N/A 
|-
! style=background:white colspan=9 |
|-
|-  bgcolor="#CCFFCC"
| 3 December 2016 || Win ||align=left| Donegi Abena || Wu Lin Feng 2016: WLF x Krush – China vs Japan, Final || Zhengzhou, China || KO || 1 || N/A
|-
! style=background:white colspan=9 |
|-
|-  bgcolor="#CCFFCC"
| 3 December 2016 || Win ||align=left| Song Liyuan || Wu Lin Feng 2016: WLF x Krush – China vs Japan, Semi Final || Zhengzhou, China || Decision (unanimous) || 3 ||  3:00 
|-
|-  bgcolor="#CCFFCC"
| 29 July 2016 || Win ||align=left| Ricardo Soneca || United Caribbean || Clevia, Suriname || TKO || 1 || N/A
|-
! style=background:white colspan=9 |
|-
|-  bgcolor="#CCFFCC"
| 28 May 2016 || Win ||align=left| Kamran Aminzadeh || God of the Arena 2|| Zhengzhou, China || Decision (unanimous) || 3 ||  3:00 
|-
|-  bgcolor="#CCFFCC"
| 30 April 2016 || Win ||align=left| Kenneth Bishop || N/A || Paramaribo, Suriname || KO || 1 || N/A
|-
|-  bgcolor="#CCFFCC"
| 20 December 2015 || Win ||align=left| Colin George || Bloed, Zweet & Tranen|| Paramaribo, Suriname || KO || 1 || N/A 
|-
|-  bgcolor="#CCFFCC"
| 1 June 2014 || Win ||align=left| Paulo Rogerio Neves Ferreira || The New Generation II – Suriname vs. Brazil || Suriname || TKO || 2 || N/A
|-
|-  bgcolor="#CCFFCC"
| 21 December 2013 || Win ||align=left| Mikhail Tyuterev || Cup of Champions 2013 || Novosibirsk, Russia || Ext. R. Decision (unanimous) || 3 ||  3:00 
|-  bgcolor="#CCFFCC"
| 28 September 2013 || Win ||align=left| Dennis Stolzenbach || Next Generation || Paramaribo, Suriname || Decision (unanimous) || 3 ||  3:00 
|-
|-  bgcolor="#CCFFCC"
| 3 August 2013 || Win ||align=left| Rodney Glunder || Beat Down || Paramaribo, Suriname || KO (punches) || 3 || N/A
|-
|-  bgcolor="#FFBBBB"
| 18 May 2013 || Loss ||align=left| Benjamin Adegbuyi || SUPERKOMBAT World Grand Prix II 2013 || Craiova, Romania || Decision (unanimous) || 3 || 3:00 
|-
|-  bgcolor="FFBBBB"
| 6 April 2013 || Loss ||align=left| Muamer Tufekčić || SUPERKOMBAT World Grand Prix I 2013, Semi Finals || Oradea, Romania || Decision (majority) || 3 || 3:00
|-
! style=background:white colspan=9 |
|-
|-  bgcolor="CCFFCC"
| 6 April 2013 || Win ||align=left| Nikolaj Falin || SUPERKOMBAT World Grand Prix I 2013, Semi Finals || Oradea, Romania || Decision (majority) || 3 || 3:00
|-
|-
|-  bgcolor="CCFFCC"
| 9 March 2013 || Win ||align=left| Oscar Isidoro || Death B4 Defeat || Paramaribo, Suriname || TKO || N/A || N/A
|-
|-  bgcolor="#CCFFCC"
| 28 December 2012 || Win ||align=left| Marcello Adriaansz || Slamm Soema na Basi III || Paramaribo, Suriname || KO || N/A || N/A
|-
|-  bgcolor="#CCFFCC"
| 20 October 2012 || Win ||align=left| Dennis Stolzenbach || Emmen Fight Night || Emmen, Netherlands || N/A || N/A || N/A
|-
|-  bgcolor="#FFBBBB"
| 12 May 2012 || Loss ||align=left| Raul Cătinaș || SUPERKOMBAT World Grand Prix II 2012, Semi Finals || Cluj Napoca, Romania || KO (left punch) || 2 || N/A
|-
|-  bgcolor="#CCFFCC"
| 28 December 2011 || Win ||align=left| Jan Siersema || Slamm Soema na Basi II || Paramaribo, Suriname || Decision || N/A || 3:00
|-
! style=background:white colspan=9 |
|-
|-  bgcolor="#CCFFCC"
| 19 November 2011 || Win ||align=left| Benjamin Adegbuyi || SUPERKOMBAT World Grand Prix 2011 Final, Reserve Fight || Darmstadt, Germany || KO (left hook) || 2 || 1:37
|-
|-  bgcolor="#FFBBBB"
| 30 October 2011 || Loss ||align=left| Michael Duut || Kickboksgala Kalverdijkje || Leeuwarden, Netherlands || Decision || 3 || 3:00
|-
|-  bgcolor="#CCFFCC"
| 26 August 2011 || Win ||align=left| Jahya Gulay || SLAMM! Events: Super Suri Thaiboxing Cup || Paramaribo, Suriname || TKO || N/A || N/A
|-
|-  bgcolor="#FFBBBB"
| 21 May 2011 || Loss ||align=left| Roman Kleibl || SuperKombat World Grand Prix I 2011, Semi Finals || Bucharest, Romania || Decision (unanimous) || 3 || 3:00
|-
|-  bgcolor="#CCFFCC"
| 15 May 2011 || Win ||align=left| Mitchell de Ligny || Rings Gala || Amstelveen, Netherlands || Decision || 3 ||3:00 
|-
|-  bgcolor="#FFBBBB"
| March 2011 || Loss ||align=left| Ricardo Soneca || Tatneft World Cup 2011 || Kazan, Russia || KO || 2 || N/A
|-
|-  bgcolor="#FFBBBB"
| 23 December 2010 || Loss ||align=left| Reamon Welboren || Wij zijn Boos Klaar om te Bosse II || Paramaribo, Suriname || Decision || 3 || 3:00
|-
|-  bgcolor="#CCFFCC"
| 24 November 2010 || Win ||align=left| Mutlu Karabulut || RINGS gala "Blood, Sweat & Tears" || Netherlands || KO || N/A || N/A
|-
|-  bgcolor="#CCFFCC"
| October 2010 || Win ||align=left| Etienne Schop || No Guts No Glory 4 || Netherlands || KO || 2 || N/A
|-
|-  bgcolor="#CCFFCC"
| 3 October 2010 || Win ||align=left| Utley Meriana || Memento Mori part 1 || Rotterdam, Netherlands || TKO || 2 || N/A
|-
|-  bgcolor="#CCFFCC"
| 29 August 2010 || Win ||align=left| Erik Rivera || Fighting with the Stars || Paramaribo, Suriname || KO || 1 || N/A
|-
|-  bgcolor="#c5d2ea"
| 21 March 2010 || Draw ||align=left| Jahfarr Wilnis || K-1 World MAX 2010 West Europe Tournament || Utrecht, Netherlands || Draw || 3 || 3:00
|-
|-  bgcolor="#FFBBBB"
| 23 December 2009 || Loss ||align=left| Murat Aygun || N/A || Paramaribo, Suriname || Decision || 3 || 3:00
|-
|-
| colspan=9 | Legend:

See also
List of current UFC fighters
List of male mixed martial artists

References

External links
 
 
 

1988 births
Living people
Surinamese male mixed martial artists
Heavyweight mixed martial artists
Mixed martial artists utilizing kickboxing
Surinamese male kickboxers
Heavyweight kickboxers
Sportspeople from Paramaribo
Ultimate Fighting Championship male fighters
SUPERKOMBAT kickboxers